

Deaths in FIA World Rally Championship

Deaths in Dakar Rally

Deaths in SCCA ProRally and Rally America

Deaths in European Rally Championship

Deaths in European National Series and National Rallies

Deaths in African Rally Championship and African Rallies

Deaths in Oceanian National Series and National Rallies

Deaths in other rally races
 XU Lang, Trans-oriental Rally, 16 June 2008
 Johnny Moacdieh, Rally of Lebanon, 18 June 1995

References 

Lists of motorsport fatalities
Rallying